The name Fengshen has been used to name four tropical cyclones in the northwestern Pacific Ocean. The name was contributed by China and literally means "God of wind".

Typhoon Fengshen (2002) (T0209, 12W) – Category 5 storm that remained over open waters for most of its life, then brushed southern Japan.
Typhoon Fengshen (2008) (T0806, 07W, Frank) – Category 3 storm that wrecked the Philippines, capsizing the MV Princess of the Stars and killing hundreds, then caused flooding in mainland China.
Severe Tropical Storm Fengshen (2014) (T1414, 13W) – a storm which formed during the weak peak of the season.
Typhoon Fengshen (2019) (T1925, 26W), a very strong late season Category 4 typhoon that remained at sea.

Pacific typhoon set index articles